Julián Cerdá Vicente (born 9 August 1981), known as Juli, is a Spanish professional footballer who plays as an attacking midfielder.

He appeared in 284 Segunda División matches over eight seasons, scoring a total of 39 goals for six clubs.

Club career
Born in Alcoy, Province of Alicante, Juli began his career with hometown's CD Alcoyano in the Tercera División. In the following three seasons he played with two clubs in the Segunda División B, achieving promotion in 2005 with CD Castellón. He stayed in that tier nonetheless, representing Benidorm CF and scoring a career-best eight goals in 33 games in his second and final year.

In the 2007–08 campaign, at already 26, Juli made his Segunda División debut, with Polideportivo Ejido. He only missed only one league match out of 42 in his first year and netted on five occasions, but the Andalusians were relegated.

Juli returned to the second tier for 2009–10, helping Elche CF to contend for promotion until the last weeks of competition – eventually ranking sixth – with the player scoring six goals. In the ensuing summer he signed for Rayo Vallecano, starting in eight of the league games he appeared in (a total of 894 minutes of action) as the Madrid outskirts side finished second and returned to La Liga, after eight years.

Juli subsequently represented Asteras Tripolis FC (Super League Greece), AD Alcorcón and Deportivo Alavés. With the latter team, he achieved another promotion to the top flight in 2016, being an ever-present figure with 40 appearances and four goals.

On 28 June 2016, Juli terminated his contract with the Basque club and signed for Córdoba CF the following month.

Honours
Alavés
Segunda División: 2015–16

References

External links

1981 births
Living people
People from Alcoy
Sportspeople from the Province of Alicante
Spanish footballers
Footballers from the Valencian Community
Association football midfielders
Segunda División players
Segunda División B players
Tercera División players
Primera Federación players
CD Alcoyano footballers
Alicante CF footballers
CD Castellón footballers
Benidorm CF footballers
Polideportivo Ejido footballers
Elche CF players
Rayo Vallecano players
AD Alcorcón footballers
Deportivo Alavés players
Córdoba CF players
Hércules CF players
Super League Greece players
Asteras Tripolis F.C. players
Spanish expatriate footballers
Expatriate footballers in Greece
Spanish expatriate sportspeople in Greece